Jeanne Gaëlle Eyenga Mbo'ossi (born 24 January 1999 in Yaoundé) is a Cameroonian weightlifter. She represented Cameroon at the 2019 African Games held in Rabat, Morocco and she won the silver medal in the women's 76kg event. She won the gold medal in her event at the 2021 African Weightlifting Championships held in Nairobi, Kenya.

She represented Cameroon at the 2020 Summer Olympics in Tokyo, Japan. She finished in 11th place in the women's 76kg event.

She competed in the women's 76kg event at the 2022 Commonwealth Games held in Birmingham, England.

References

External links 
 

Living people
1999 births
Cameroonian female weightlifters
African Games medalists in weightlifting
African Games silver medalists for Cameroon
Competitors at the 2019 African Games
Weightlifters at the 2020 Summer Olympics
Olympic weightlifters of Cameroon
Sportspeople from Yaoundé
African Weightlifting Championships medalists
Weightlifters at the 2022 Commonwealth Games
Commonwealth Games competitors for Cameroon
Islamic Solidarity Games competitors for Cameroon
Islamic Solidarity Games medalists in weightlifting
21st-century Cameroonian women